Ryan George Peter Bester (born 7 December 1984 in Hanover, Canada) is a Canadian lawn bowler.

Bowls career

World Outdoor Championships
Bester won the gold medal in the pairs with Keith Roney at the 2004 World Outdoor Bowls Championship in Ayr. After winning a bronze in the 2008 World Outdoor Bowls Championship he finished runner-up to Leif Selby in the 2012 World Outdoor Bowls Championship men's singles. He won his fifth World Championship medal when winning a silver medal in the singles at the 2016 World Outdoor Bowls Championship in Christchurch.

In 2020 he was selected for the 2020 World Outdoor Bowls Championship in Australia.

Commonwealth Games
He clinched the silver medal in the 2014 Commonwealth Games in lawn bowling. He also won bronze medal in 2006 Commonwealth Games in Melbourne.

In November 2017, Bester was named to Canada's 2018 Commonwealth Games team. During the 2018 Commonwealth Games on the Gold Coast in Queensland he won a silver medal in the singles. In 2022, he competed in the men's singles and the men's pairs at the 2022 Commonwealth Games.

Asia Pacific and Atlantic
Bester has won eight medals at the Asia Pacific Bowls Championships, a singles gold in 2005, a silver in the singles and bronze in the pairs in 2007, double bronze in 2011 and a pairs gold in 2015. His seventh and eighth medals came in with a singles silver and pairs bronze at the 2019 Asia Pacific Bowls Championships in the Gold Coast, Queensland. In 2007 he won the singles gold medal at the Atlantic Bowls Championships.

References

External links
 Ryan Bester at Bowls Canada
  (2002–2014)
 
 
 
 

1984 births
Living people
Canadian male bowls players
Bowls World Champions
Commonwealth Games competitors for Canada
Commonwealth Games silver medallists for Canada
Commonwealth Games bronze medallists for Canada
Commonwealth Games medallists in lawn bowls
Bowls players at the 2002 Commonwealth Games
Bowls players at the 2006 Commonwealth Games
Bowls players at the 2010 Commonwealth Games
Bowls players at the 2014 Commonwealth Games
Bowls players at the 2018 Commonwealth Games
Bowls players at the 2022 Commonwealth Games
20th-century Canadian people
21st-century Canadian people
Medallists at the 2006 Commonwealth Games
Medallists at the 2014 Commonwealth Games
Medallists at the 2018 Commonwealth Games